Serhiy Predko (born 25 April 1988 in Ukrainian SSR, Soviet Union) is a professional Ukrainian football defender currently plaining for the Italian Serie C1/A club A.C. Pro Sesto. He was acquired from Torino FC in July 2007.From February he is in S.S.Cavese football team [Italian] [First Division]

External links 
Profile on Official Club Website 
European footballers

1988 births
Living people
People from Chervonohrad
Serie A players
Serie C players
Torino F.C. players
Ukrainian footballers
S.S.D. Pro Sesto players
Association football defenders
Asti Calcio F.C. players
Cavese 1919 players
U.S.D. Novese players